Dolichocis is a genus of tree-fungus beetle in the family Ciidae.

Species
 Dolichocis laricinus Mellié, 1848
 Dolichocis yuasai M. Chûjô, 1941

References

Ciidae genera